{{DISPLAYTITLE:C18H23NO2}}
The molecular formula C18H23NO2 (molar mass: 285.39 g/mol, exact mass: 285.1728 u) may refer to:

 Butinazocine
 Desocodeine
 Ketazocine, or ketocyclazocine
 Medrylamine